Zero order reaction

Zero-order process (statistics), a sequence of random variables, each independent of the previous ones
Zero order process (chemistry), a chemical reaction in which the rate of change of concentration is independent of the concentrations
Zeroth-order approximation, an approximation of a function by a constant
Zeroth-order logic, a form of logic without quantifiers

See also 
 Zero (disambiguation)
 0O (disambiguation)